Alaafin Atiba Atobatele was a prince of the Oyo empire. He was the son of Alaafin Abiodun of Oyo and Eni-olufan from Akeitan.

Early life 
Prince Atiba Atobatele was the son of King Abiodun of Oyo. and Eni-olufan from Akeitan, a slave in Gudugbu country who offered as surety to King Abiodun. Atiba's childhood friend was Onipede whose mother was a Gudugbu citizen and a bosom friend of Eni-olufan. Both boys were born in Gudugbu. Not long after the death of his father and the installation of King Aole in Oyo, his mother relocated with him to Akeitan since they did not find favor with the new king. As he grew up, Atiba learned tailoring, but he was more interested in the efficiency and reward of thievery and kidnapping. As a result of his waywardness, he was driven from Akeitan and relocated to Ago town. At his new station, his new host named Oja, the Baale of Ago, was an accommodating man who, like Atiba, would not listen despite protests by his younger brother, Elebu. Prince Atiba raised his private army made up of lawless outlaws and slaves. He grew rapidly in wealth and military might. After the death of Oja, his brother, Elebu, became the new Baale of Ago. His opposition to Atiba continued but he was handicapped because, at that time, Atiba had gained popularity in the community. As part of the reconciliation process, Shitta of Ilorin, to whom Ago paid tribute, required both Elebu and Atiba to convert to Islam, and had all children, adults, and elderly in Ago town adopt Islamic names.

Life as a warrior 
During the Gbodo war, Elebu, Baale of Ago drowned in the Ogun River.  It was also during the war that the eternal friendship of Prince Atiba and Onipede, his bosom friend, was broken. Before then, the whole town knew about the friendships. No one could see Atiba except through Onipede. He always had a retinue of followers and hanger-on. He was treated like a prince even though he was not one. He began to see himself as an equal.  The Ilorin army had routed the Yoruba troop. As Atiba made to escape to the other side of the Ogun River, from the Baribas' hot pursuit, his horse was shot dead. Rather than help his friend, Onipede ran past him safely to the other side of the river without offering help even as Atiba cried in agony. Atiba would have died but for the help of Yesufu, his uncle from Akeitan town who took him on his horse to the other side of the river. Thus began, the hostility between the two former confidants and friends. Back in Ago, after the Gbodo enterprise and on Prince Atiba's order, Onipede was murdered.

After the death of Elebu, Prince Atiba named Ailumo the Mogaji and himself the administrator of Ago town. At this stage, the headship and rulership of Ago town moved away from Oja, the founder, and his descendants.

Kingship 
While Atiba became the administrator of Ago town, his eyes were really to become the next Oyo King. He allied with the powerful war chiefs at the time; Oluyole of Ibadan and Kurunmi of Ijaye; promising to install both the Basorun and Are-ona-kakanfo respectively.

After the death of King Oluewu of Oyo in 1835, the Eleduwe war, and the destruction of the old Oyo empire, it was decided there was a need to install a Prince who had the power and wealth to rebuild. The Oyo Mesi sent emissaries to Prince Atiba. Immediately after his coronation, he immediately reconstituted the kingdom and conferred titles.

Among those was the Basorun title to Oluyole of Ibadan, a descendant of Basorun Yamba. Oluyole's father was Olokuoye and his mother, Agbonrin, daughter of King Abiodun. Therefore, Oluyole was Prince Atiba's nephew. Oluyole was conferred with the title in Oyo. This was the first time, a high chief next to the King would reside outside the kingdom. Are-ona-kakanfo, the Field Marshall of Yoruba armies, was conferred on, Kurunmi of Ijaye. A good friend of King Atiba. He had to go to Oyo to be conferred. A man of great power; A tactician and a man of intellect. He would protect Yorubaland against external aggressions and restore her lost glory.

These two high offices next to the Oyo sovereign, had their functions delineated as follows:

 Each would defend all provinces under her control and made efforts to recover lost countries from the Fulanis of Ilorin.
 An Oyo King would no longer lead war but would be preoccupied with all religions, and civil matters in the Yoruba nation.
 Ibadan would freely administer towns in the north, north-east of Ijesas, Ekitis, and eastern regions; and protect them against all external aggressions.
 Ijaye would protect Yoruba towns in the western provinces and carry out military operations against Sabes and Popos.
 The towns of Iluku, Saki, Gboho, Kihisi, the ancient Oyo, and surrounding towns would be under the direct rulership and administration of the New Oyo.

The Ibadan army became highly successful and the most enduring power in Yorubaland. These successes encouraged Basorun Oluyole of Ibadan and he decided to take the throne of Oyo for himself, replacing Atiba, the Alaafin of Oyo. However, there were two obstacles. He was a nephew of Atiba from the female line, which made succession impossible in Yorubaland. The only other obstacle was Kurunmi, the Are-ona-kakanfo, who swore he would never allow the attack on Oyo while he was still alive. Atiba became aware of Oluyole's intent, so he got Latubosun, a spiritualist to fortify the city against sudden attacks and also resolved to manage Ibadan diplomatically. When attempts to co-op Kurunmi's support did not work including the demand that Kurunmi should come to Ibadan to pay obeisance, an opportunity came when the Ijaye army attacked Fiditi town. Asu, the founder sought and got the help of the Ibadan army. This unpopular war lasted close to two years until Alaafin of Oyo sent the emblem of the god Sango to both warring parties to cease their sword which both parties respected and normalcy was restored.

Social reforms 
As a result of thousands of slaves captured as spoils of wars; the movement of several immigrants to Ibadan from several countries in Yorubaland because of her military might and strengths; the town witnessed rapid expansions which required the need for social reforms and laws. In 1858, the Ibadan Council of chiefs, under the rulership of Balogun Ibikunle, agreed and communicated to King Atiba, Alaafin of Oyo, for approval. Not only did he approve, but he also adopted these reforms in the new Oyo kingdom and all surrounding Oyo towns.

As a result of the adaptation of the new reforms in Ibadan, Atiba, the Alaafin of Oyo, was able to put a stop to the old Oyo tradition where the Aremo (Crown Prince) had to die with a deceased king.

Death  
King Atiba died at a very old age. He was the vital link between the old Oyo empire and the new Oyo kingdom. He had many children two of whom later became king. The first child, Adelu (the Crown Prince), and the fourth child, Adeyemi Adedotun. In 1858, King Atiba decided he would celebrate the Bebe. This festival was celebrated by kings who attained old age and had peaceful reign, but few kings who had the privilege of celebrating it died almost immediately thereafter. King Atiba rejected all entreaties not to celebrate the Bebe. The very significance of celebrating Bebe was the only time a living King could visit Bara to perform the certain traditional ceremony, else only on the coronation of a king and when he was interred after his demise. Therefore, announcements were made in all Yoruba countries. Noblemen, priestess and Egungun were present. Not long after the Bebe, King Atiba Atobatele died and Adelu, his son based on the new succession law was installed as the new Alaafin of Oyo. According to Rev. Johnson, King Atiba fathered the following princes "Adelu (The Crown Prince), Adelabu, Adesiyen, Adeyemi, Adediran, Adejumo, Olawoyin, Tela Agbojul'ogun, Ala (was of the same brother as Adewusi), Adewusi (was Adelu's brother), Adesetan I, Adeleye, Adesetan II, Adedotun, Afonja, Agborin, Tela Okiti papa, Ogo, Momodu, Adesokan and Adejojo".

References 

Yoruba history
1800s deaths
Yoruba people
Yoruba warriors